Francis Hamilton Rankin Sr. (October 19, 1818 – August 11, 1900 in Flint, Michigan) was a Michigan, United States politician and publisher.   He was a member of and Grand Master of the Independent Order of Odd Fellows and in 1873 was the Sovereign Lodge's Grand Representative. He received the Knight Templar degree in the Masons.

Early life
Born in County Down, Ireland to Joseph Rankin, He married Arabella Hearn of County Longford, Ireland.  He came to the United States in 1848 initially to Pontiac, Michigan, where he learned the trade of printing.   In 1850, he came to Flint, Michigan and founded the Genesee Whig, a weekly newspaper.   On December 28, 1854, he had a son of the same name.

Political life
Rankin was appointed to the Flint City Charter draft committee in 1855. Rankin served on the School Board for several terms.    In 1860, he was elected to the first of two terms in Michigan House of Representatives.  Rankin was elected City of Flint Recorder in 1872 serving a one-year term.  In 1874, he returned to that position, serving additional terms until the city charter was amended to replace the elected Recorder office with a common council appointed clerk in 1876.  He was the first person appointed to the office of City Clerk of Flint.  In addition to being the City clerk, Rankin was elected as a Michigan State Senator in 1877 serving a single term.  Under Governor Crapo, Rankin served as one of several prison inspectors.  From 1879 to 1887, he served as postmaster.

Post-political life
In 1895, with William C. Durant and several other individuals, they founded a fraternal beneficiary society on January 31, 1895 called the Knights of the Loyal Guard.

References

1818 births
1900 deaths
19th-century American politicians
Michigan state senators